A museum attendant (or gallery attendant) looks after a gallery in a museum for security reasons, to help museum visitors, and sometimes to help curators in moving objects or changing the gallery displays. The position is sometimes undertaken by volunteers.

Responsibilities 

Typical responsibilities include:

 Conducting the front of house operation of museum
 Provides information about regulations, facilities, and exhibits to visitors
 Opening museum during opening hours
 Greeting visitors on arrival
 Inviting visitors to sign the visitor book
 Monitoring visitors while viewing exhibits
 Cautioning people (often children) for not complying with museum regulations
 Handing out promotional materials
 Answering questions concerning exhibits, regulations, facilities, etc.
 Arranging tours for schools or other groups
 Organizing volunteers or other staff members to conduct tours
 Examining exhibits and objects periodically
 Notifying museum personnel when repair or replacement is required

The exact nature of the responsibilities required will depend on the size and type of museum, and the exact role designated to the museum attendant.

References

Attendant